Melikkend may refer to:
 Melikgyugh, Armenia
 Məlikkənd, Azerbaijan

See also
 Malikkand (disambiguation)